Cryptolepis cryptolepioides is a species of flowering plant in the family Apocynaceae. It is a twining climber in shrubs and trees, and is native to rocky hillsides and escarpments in northern South Africa and Zimbabwe.

References

External links

Periplocoideae